Potted shrimps are a traditional British dish made with brown shrimp flavored with nutmeg. The dish consists of brown shrimp in nutmeg-flavoured butter, which has set in a small pot, the butter acting as a preservative. Cayenne pepper may also be included. It is traditionally eaten with bread.

Potted shrimp was a favourite dish of Ian Fleming who passed on his predilection for the delicacy to his fictional creation James Bond. Fleming reputedly used to eat the dish at Scotts Restaurant on Mount Street in London.

See also

 Food preservation
 Hatchet Job of the Year
 Potted meat

References

Lancashire cuisine
Shrimp dishes
Foods featuring butter
Food preservation